Exodus is a supervillain appearing in American comic books published by Marvel Comics. Created by writer Scott Lobdell and artist Joe Quesada, he first appeared in X-Factor #92 (July 1993). His real name was initially given as Paris Bennett, but this was uncovered as an alias when he was revealed to have been born in 12th-century France under the name of Bennet Du Paris.

Fictional character biography

Origin
Born in the 12th century, Bennet du Paris had always felt different, as if he had a deep hidden power. As an adult he was a crusader and became best friends with Eobar Garrington, the Black Knight of that era. The two had set out on a quest to find the Tower of Power, the domain of the mythic "Eternal Pharaoh" in Aqaba when Dane Whitman (the 20th century Black Knight) and Sersi had been transported back to the 12th century, Whitman transported into Eobar's body. Eobar retained control, but felt something was wrong. When he came into contact with Sersi, he abandoned the quest, angering du Paris, who then left to find the tower alone. Traveling for hours through violent sandstorms, when he finally collapsed, a voice spoke to him, asking him if he was willing to risk everything to become one of the strong. Du Paris was then tested, and his mutant powers manifested for the first time. Proving himself strong, he disappeared from the spot.

Meanwhile, Sersi had awakened Dane's mind and he now had control of his body as Eobar passed on. While searching for du Paris, the two were captured by Apocalypse. When they awoke they found Bennet du Paris had been transformed into Exodus, recognizing him as the same Exodus from the 20th century. Apocalypse commanded Exodus to destroy the Black Knight. When Dane refused to kill Exodus, Sersi intervened, though her attack proved useless. Apocalypse again commanded Exodus to kill Sersi and Dane, though this time Exodus refused. He turned on Apocalypse, calling him a "false god". Apocalypse stripped Exodus of his power and sealed him away in a crypt in the Swiss Alps.

Six months later, Dane found the crypt in which Exodus was trapped and in a coma-like state. He found there was a curse preventing Exodus from leaving, yet others were allowed to come and go as they pleased. Dane left guards who had sworn to look after the crypt for generations to come, and he and Sersi returned to their time.

Acolytes
Sometime later, in the 20th century, Magneto found and freed Exodus, taking him back to Avalon. Exodus became Magneto's right-hand man, replacing Fabian Cortez, who had betrayed Magneto. Exodus appeared before the government sanctioned team X-Factor (his first actual appearance). It seemed as though Exodus wanted to tell them something, but he refrained and left.

Exodus then appeared before the mutant team X-Force to take Cannonball and Sunspot to Avalon with him. They declined, but the team proved no match for Exodus. Exodus was followed back, and X-Force invaded Avalon to rescue their teammates. The whole of X-Force fled the station, but not before Cable was mortally wounded by Magneto.

When Charles Xavier wiped Magneto's mind clean in an attack by the X-Men on Avalon, Exodus assumed leadership of the Acolytes. Exodus would converse with the mindless Magneto, believing he could hear Magneto's voice.

Soon after, Fabian Cortez had resurfaced in Genosha, where he had taken Magneto's granddaughter Luna prisoner. The tension between the mutants and humans there had erupted and Genosha was in a state of war. When Luna's mother Crystal realized Luna had been taken, she and the Avengers left for Genosha.
Meanwhile, Quicksilver and the X-Men had also gone to Genosha to save Luna. Exodus arrived in Genosha to save the mutant people and destroy the humans. He quickly came to blows with the Avengers, defeating both War Machine and Sersi before leaving. Exodus then found Fabian Cortez in the sewers of Genosha, using the baby Luna as a human shield. Cortez tried his best to escape, telling Quicksilver, Scarlet Witch, Crystal, and Jean Grey they must kill Exodus in exchange for Luna's life. They were no match for Exodus, however, and he took control of Cortez, making him hand over Luna and seemingly killing him.

Exodus then appeared to the mutants of Genosha, telling them to kill all humans or the entire island would be crushed under his force field. The Avengers and X-Men teamed up and took the fight to Exodus, but it proved futile. It was not until Professor Xavier unleashed a powerful psionic attack on Exodus that Black Knight was able to sneak up on Exodus, cutting through him with his energy blade. Exodus, weakened and defeated, left for Avalon, but not before unleashing a powerful attack on Quicksilver. It was also revealed during this battle that Black Knight remembered Exodus, but not from where or when.

Exodus vs. Holocaust
The Acolytes discovered a cocoon of ice with a living being inside floating near Avalon. Despite some Acolyte's objections, Exodus ordered the cocoon to be brought on board, believing it to be a sign of things to come. This, together with his insistence that he hears Magneto's voice and refusal to show Magneto's body, made some Acolytes doubt his sanity. During the night the being inhabiting the cocoon awoke and absorbed several Acolytes, killing them. The being turned out to be Holocaust, one of the survivors of the altered reality the Age of Apocalypse. Holocaust confused Exodus with his AoA counterpart. Holocaust knew that he was among enemies when he heard of Magneto's presence. Exodus and Holocaust battled without regard for anything around them, destroying Avalon and sending its remnants to Earth.

Severely weakened from his battle with Holocaust, Exodus made his way back to the crypt in the Swiss Alps where Apocalypse had originally locked him away. Exodus hoped to rest and regain his powers there, but discovered that his powers had somehow changed. Exodus became a kind of "psychic vampire", needing to absorb the psionic energy of others. When he sensed the energies of Cable and X-Man nearby, he was delighted at the sheer power they possessed. Exodus battled X-Man, becoming more powerful every time X-Man used his power. It looked as though Exodus would be victorious until X-Man discovered Exodus' link to Apocalypse. Enraged, X-Man let loose the full extent of his power, which proved to be too much for Exodus to absorb. X-Man then buried Exodus alive by telekinetically tearing open and then slamming shut a huge chasm in an entire mountain.

Back with the Acolytes
Exodus survived, his powers reverted to normal, and he returned to leading the Acolytes. A weakened High Evolutionary had given shelter to Luna, and Exodus resolved to kill her and the High Evolutionary as non-mutant "human abominations." Exodus sent an army of Mutates and a team of Acolytes in an attack against the Evolutionary's base, Wundagore Mountain. Despite opposition from Quicksilver and the Knights of Wundagore, Exodus successfully gained control of the citadel while Luna and the High Evolutionary escaped. Exodus considered it his "holy mission" to rid the world of impure and artificial mutants such as the High Evolutionary and his creations, the beings known as Inhumans, and those infected with the Legacy Virus. He sent a team which included Pyro, Avalanche, Omega Red, and Feral to find the High Evolutionary, promising the infected members a cure to the Legacy Virus. He also sent Fabian Cortez on a mission to destroy the Terrigen Mists in the Inhuman city of Attilan; however in the end, Cortez failed.

The High Evolutionary decided it was time to regain control of Mount Wundagore, and set off with a team towards the citadel. There he was betrayed by Man Beast who stole the scepter housing Isotope E, greatly empowering him. Exodus and his Acolytes appeared and Exodus demanded the isotope be handed over. Man Beast refused to comply. After a horrific battle between Exodus and Man Beast, the two came to the conclusion that they had much in common and decided to share the isotope. Together they took Quicksilver, the Knights of Wundagore, and the Heroes for Hire prisoner. Quicksilver eventually escaped, gained control of Isotope E himself, turned the isotope on himself, and became more powerful than he had ever been before. Exodus apparently proved no match for the super-charged Quicksilver and was soundly defeated.

Just as Pietro began to celebrate however, the High Evolutionary's power swang toward the other extreme at the expense of his sanity. The Evolutionary announced his plan to evolve the Earth above and beyond the suffering of ordinary life. The Acolytes refused to help in the battle against High Evolutionary, prompting Exodus to call them cowards; the mutant announced that the High Evolutionary was an abomination and that Exodus would defeat him by any means necessary. Thena and Exodus' subsequently proved ineffective, until Man Beast appeared and suggested that the three of them unite their psionic power, as his intimate knowledge of the Evolutionary might allow them to hurt him in an unguarded moment. Quicksilver reasoned with the Evolutionary, who agreed to reconsider his objectives, but at this moment the combined psionic attack of Exodus, Thena, and the Man Beast struck him down. Exodus then incapacitated Thena, hoping to deal the final blow to the Evolutionary himself.

With the High Evolutionary depowered, Quicksilver reverted to normal, and Thena incapacitated, Exodus attempted once more to destroy the High Evolutionary. However, he was again halted in his attempt, this time by the voice of the Black Knight. The Knight allowed Exodus into his mind where the mutant discovered that this Black Knight was his friend from centuries ago. The two then engaged in combat until the Black Knight defeated Exodus and once again sealed him in the crypt Apocalypse had created.

Later on, Exodus escaped from his prison yet again, this time emerging as a changed man. Disguising himself as Magneto, Exodus used his psionic power (boosted by technological means) to bring peace to the island nation of Genosha, forcing humans and mutants to coexist. When he was eventually unmasked by the X-Men, Exodus proclaimed himself a penitent trying desperately to atone for his bigoted past. Without his control, however, Genosha descended into civil war once more, leaving Exodus emotionally devastated.

Brotherhood of Mutants
This experience apparently leads him to renew his conviction that mutants were superior and that they were intended to inherit the earth. Having formed a new Brotherhood consisting of Avalanche, Nocturne, Sabretooth, Mammomax, and Black Tom, Exodus leads an attack on a group of humans but was thwarted by the X-Men. After escaping, this new Brotherhood decided to attack the X-Men in their home. Two of the residents, a young mutant child and a cafeteria employee, die as a result. For the Brotherhood the attack proves a complete disaster, resulting in most of the Brotherhood, Exodus included, being sucked into the mutant Xorn's head. They reappear in Mojoworld and make a deal with Mojo to leave. It is unknown whether this deal will come up later.

After M-Day
Exodus was one of the few mutants who retained his powers after the events of the House of M storyline. In the '198 Files', he is listed as a severe danger. He now leads a new team of Acolytes with Frenzy, Random, and Tempo as followers. Exodus and his new Acolytes attack the S.H.I.E.L.D. Helicarrier that is above the Xavier Institute. Their intent is to capture and use Cable to reveal how many mutant births would occur in the future. During the attack, he is opposed by Rogue's team as well as the deprogrammed Northstar and Aurora. Upon discovering the revelation that no more mutant births occur post-Decimation and that he, his Acolytes, the X-Men, and the remaining mutants worldwide are now an endangered species, he leaves. In Antarctica, he bows to Mister Sinister, who reveals that he has a plan to save mutantkind from extinction.

Marauders
After defeating the Hecatomb on Providence, the X-Men return to Mystique's home where they are betrayed by Mystique, Lady Mastermind, and a possessed Omega Sentinel and attacked by the Marauders. This is seemingly part of a three pronged plan, alongside Gambit and Sunfire in Providence who attack Cable, and Exodus with his new group of Acolytes who ambush the Xavier Institute while only Kitty Pryde, Colossus, and the New X-Men are home. It is apparent that Exodus has allied with the Marauders as part of Mister Sinister's plan to save the mutant race from extinction, leading to, 'X-Men: Messiah Complex'.

X-Men: Messiah Complex
Emma Frost was able to stalemate Exodus in Muir Island. He was incapacitated and severely injured by Dust when she emerges from inside of him, using her sand form to tear his innards severely.

X-Men: Legacy
It is revealed that Professor Xavier is in the care of the Acolytes after being shot by Bishop. Exodus has apparently fully recovered from Dust's attack and is trying to treat the head wound inflicted on the Professor by Bishop. Despite being in a weakened state, Xavier is resisting Exodus' efforts which requires rebuilding Xavier's damaged brain atom by atom but only if all of Xavier's memories are temporarily removed. Exodus eventually succeeds despite Xavier's resistance, but matters become complicated when Xavier's mind refuses to accept the memories back.

Exodus is then forced to seek out the aid of the one person who may be able to restore Xavier's mind: Magneto. Magneto, with help from Karima Shapandar, manages to restore some of Xavier's memories. Later, Magneto is attacked by Exodus, who wishes to punish him for an earlier assault on the Acolyte known as Frenzy. Exodus asks him what punishment he would have instilled on a human who injured a mutant (as the Acolytes now consider him to now be a human and even claim that Magneto is dead and that Lehnsherr is just the human shell that was left over). Magneto states that he would kill a human who harmed a mutant, and Exodus proceeds to choke him telekinetically before Xavier challenges Exodus on the astral plane.

As Exodus and Xavier duel telepathically, Exodus forces Xavier to face his greatest failures: Legion, his relationship with Cyclops, the devastation of Genosha by Cassandra Nova, and the deaths of Banshee, Thunderbird, and Sophie Cuckoo, among others. As Xavier is about to succumb to Exodus, Xavier pulls himself together and proclaims that he has had enough, seemingly throwing back Exodus' attack with a fierce psionic assault.

After the battle, the victorious Xavier threatens to shut off Exodus' powers permanently if Exodus attacks again. Exodus extends an offer to Xavier to lead the Acolytes but Xavier refuses, calling Exodus a fool for making such an offer, given how much pain and suffering has befallen those who have been entrusted to Xavier's care in the past. Xavier later returns to New Avalon and convinces Exodus to disband the Acolytes and find a new way to help mutantkind. Exodus renounces the name Magneto gave him and decides to embark on a personal pilgrimage in order to do this, while some of the former Acolytes--Amelia Voght, Random and Karima Shapandar make the decision to relocate to San Francisco.

ReGenesis
Exodus re-appears at the newly established Jean Grey School for Higher Leaning, having heard of the events in Schism that split the X-Men apart. Confronting Wolverine, Rogue, Rachel Grey, Gambit and his former Acolyte, Frenzy, he tells them that their decision to break from Utopia is unacceptable and that he intends to "re-unify" them. After a short, but intense battle, Wolverine tells Exodus to look into their minds so he can understand exactly why they choose to leave Utopia. Exodus is shocked at what he discovers and becomes particularly concerned at Cyclops' decision to risk Hope's life in combat. He apologizes to the group, telling them that they were completely justified in their decision to leave and then departs for Utopia, intending to confront Cyclops personally. Realizing what they have done, Wolverine and his team rushed off to stop him. They engaged him in battle but Rogue realized that they were not strong enough to defeat him by themselves, and sent a distress call to Utopia - hoping that Cyclops's Extinction Team would aid them - despite Wolverine's objections. The extinction team was otherwise occupied however, and the call was answered by Hope Summers and her team. Together the two teams managed to incapacitate Exodus after his powers are twice weakened by Rogue and copied by Hope. He is taken to Utopia and jailed, but not before he reminded them that it is only a matter of time before the remaining mutants are back under one roof.

Once Danger released all the prisoners on Utopia, Exodus presumably went free. He reappeared some time later under SHIELD's employment when they needed a psychic to deal with an omega-level mutant. However, psionic contact with the mutant instantly killed him. This death is eventually undone when Cyclops' former student, Tempus, went back in time to prevent the omega-level mutant from being born.

All-New, All-Different
In light of the M-Pox crisis, Exodus took over the operations of Someday Enterprises, a shady organization that promised to protect mutants by placing them in stasis but had been weaponizing them instead. Exodus intended to use Someday's Sleepers to attack an anti-mutant rally in Washington, D.C. to stoke the fires of fear towards mutants.

He was confronted by Magneto and his team of X-Men who were trying to free the mutants under his control, and Exodus claimed he had been trying to build Magneto an army to consolidate mutant power in the wake of the Terrigen threat through terrorism. Magneto defeated him and had him sealed up in Xorn's temple to be used as a fail-safe in case the threat towards mutants reached its peak. Exodus was later awakened off-panel and befriended the young mutant Elixir, with both mutants coming to Magneto's rescue shortly after he suffered a fatal injury in battle with Psylocke. After extending a halfhearted offer to Magneto to come with them, Exodus teleported himself and Elixir away to parts unknown.

Sometime later, Exodus and Elixir were approached by Magneto, who sought their help in containing the Mothervine virus, an aggressive and unstable bioweapon released worldwide by a villainous consortium led by Bastion and Havok. With his teleportation powers, Exodus rapidly transported himself, Elixir, and Magneto around the world, allowing Elixir to use his own mutant powers to neutralize the virus in each impact zone. Afterward he transported the trio to the masterminds' base, where Elixir neutralized the remaining Mothervine samples and put an end to its threat once and for all.

During a trip taken by Magneto into the future, Exodus was shown to be a member of a new Brotherhood along with Magneto, the Blob, Magik, Sabretooth, Toad, and Unuscione. This Brotherhood is said to have combated the Reaver virus (a mysterious new bioweapon that seemingly transforms victims into cyborgs against their will) after the Avengers and the X-Men both proved incapable of stopping the spread of the infection. Although this Brotherhood's efforts were not completely successful, they are credited with mutantkind's survival and the mutants of the future regard them as saviors.

House of X 
During the end of the "House of X" mini-series, all mutants are welcome in Krakoa, even the ones who've had past confrontations with others. Exodus is one of them, he arrives with the likes of Apocalypse, Mr. Sinister, Callisto, Gorgon, Daken, and other "questionable" characters. Charles Xavier is offering Exodus a place as long as he submits to the laws of Krakoa, serving a purpose higher than want or need. 
While negotiations and pacts with different world powers and institutions still remain to be cleared, Krakoa has already declared itself as an independent nation. In doing so, its most prominent figures have been elected as part of The Quiet Council of Krakoa, a court of 14 seats. The council is divided into four groups composed of 3 members each and a fourth made up by two members. Exodus has agreed to be a part of the "Winter" Chapter along with Mystique and Mr. Sinister.

During the "Empyre" storyline, Exodus is among the psychic mutants that are summoned to Genosha. He is among those who witness Magik's fight with the Cotatinaught.

Powers and abilities
Exodus is an Omega-level Mutant and one of the most powerful mutants on earth. He possesses vast superhuman powers, including telepathy, telekinesis, and teleportation, as well as superhuman durability and healing. His high power levels may be a result of tampering by Apocalypse.

His telepathic abilities have at times matched those of Professor X, Emma Frost and Rachel Grey and less than X-Man and Jean Grey. Exodus has also used mind control to command a dozen X-Men to immediately fall asleep.

Exodus is able to use his telekinetic abilities to lift heavy objects, generate highly durable force fields around him, project damaging blasts and disassemble and reassemble complex technological devices. The Hulk and Apocalypse have been able to withstand his telekinetic attacks. He also uses this ability to allow himself and fellow Acolytes to affect a form of flight. His telekinesis has sufficient fine control that he could perfectly reform Charles Xavier after Xavier's brain and skull were obliterated.

Exodus is a teleporter of great range. He has used this ability to transport himself and others across the planet and regularly transported Acolytes between Earth and the orbiting space station Avalon.

Exodus exhibits superhuman durability and taken multiple blows and cuts which would shred an ordinary human including blows from Cannonball and Rogue (using Kid Gladiator's strength), gunfire from Hope, detonation from Gambit, and stabbing from Wolverine's claws.

Exodus has also stated that he can heal and also bring the dead back to life. He appears to have done so on several occasions bringing back Acolytes who had been killed as well as Professor X.

Exodus quickly healed himself after Dust entered his mouth in sand form and obliterated his organs. He was on his feet and gathering Xavier's destroyed brains telekinetically and teleporting his team off of Muir Island only minutes after losing his internal organs.

Exodus is either immortal or extremely long-lived.

Once, when severely weakened, he acted as a "psionic vampire", absorbing and stealing psionic energy from those around him and using it to his own advantage to re-energize himself.

In the presence of the loyal Acolytes his powers have appeared to be greatly amplified. He showed himself capable of simultaneously:
 Amplifying Genoshan mutates' hatred of humans
 Crushing Genosha via a massive force field
 Immobilizing Quicksilver, Scarlet Witch, Crystal and Jean Grey in another force field
 Mentally resisting Professor X's telepathic control
 Protecting himself from physical attacks
 Dealing out powerful psionic damage to both the X-Men and the Avengers

Exodus has also been shown able to counter at least one form of reality manipulation and his powers are proved too great to be absorbed by Rogue in their entirety, which led her to pick just one.

Other versions

2099
In the Marvel 2099 universe, Exodus appeared in X-Nation 2099. He was able to defeat X-Nation and the Wild Boys solo and resist the magic of Mademoiselle Strange and even the reality warping powers of Twilight. He became the leader of one of the factions searching for the "Mutant Messiah". His search was hampered by worldwide flooding.

Age of Apocalypse
In the Age of Apocalypse, Exodus was removed from his stasis by Apocalypse and was tortured by The Madri. Exodus was rescued by Magneto and became a member of the X-Men. Like his Earth-616 counterpart, this Exodus was one of Magneto's most powerful followers, though lacking the cruelty of his mainstream counterpart (something that may have been linked to his romantic involvement with the AoA version of Dazzler). Exodus was not aware of all his powers as Magneto never told him, afraid that his full power might corrupt him. Necessity forced Magneto to tell Exodus about his powers of teleportation.

House Of M
In this alternate reality, Exodus rules Australia, assisted by Pyro and the Vanisher. They see the humans as nothing more than servants. This attitude brings them trouble when they harass some of the Hulk's newfound friends. The Hulk ends up attacking the seat of power directly, knocking Exodus down, seemingly claiming rulership over all Australia. Having been abandoned by Magneto for bringing the trouble on himself by disobeying Magneto's orders, Exodus attempts to keep control but quickly loses it. Later, Magneto contacts Banner and attempts to convince him that Exodus was willing to take over again and leave the Aborigines alone.

X-Men '92
Exodus appears in both volumes of X-Men '92 as one of the Four Horsemen of Apocalypse. Curiously, he is referred to by Apocalypse as Bastion in one panel, in what was apparently an editorial mix-up (Bastion is another of Apocalypse's Horsemen in this reality). A new villain was also introduced in the second title, the very-similarly named X-odus the Forgotten Celestial. X-odus' plans to destroy the Earth unite the villainous mutants and humankind with the X-Men.

In other media

Video games
 Exodus appears as a boss in the videogames X-Men: Mutant Apocalypse, X-Men 2: Clone Wars, and X-Men: Gamesmaster's Legacy.
 He makes cameo appearances in every character's ending in X-Men: Children of the Atom, coming to Magneto's aid after his defeat and apparently perishing with his master in Avalon's destruction.
 He also makes a cameo appearance in Magneto's Marvel vs. Capcom 3 ending, appearing as one of the many mutants flying freely in the new mutant sanctuary Magneto has transformed Galactus's space ship into.

Novels
 Exodus appears in all three books of the Mutant Empire trilogy written by Christopher Golden. As in the comics, he is Magneto's faithful lieutenant and guardian of the space station Avalon. Despite his great power, Magneto does not call on Exodus for aid in his plan to occupy New York City and transform it into a sanctuary city for mutants, leading to his eventual defeat at the hands of the X-Men.

Other appearances
 An action figure of Exodus was produced by Toy Biz as part of the merged X-Men/X-Force line. He was packaged with a removable cape, wings and a plasma ball accessory.
 Exodus is a playing piece in the Heroclix game system. He has the Acolytes, Brotherhood of Mutants, Marauders, Past, and Warrior keywords, and is played at 191pts.

References

External links
Marvel Directory
Marvel Universe entry
Marvel Database entry

Characters created by Joe Quesada
Characters created by Scott Lobdell
Fictional characters with healing abilities
Fictional characters with superhuman durability or invulnerability
Comics characters introduced in 1993
Marvel Comics characters who can move at superhuman speeds
Marvel Comics characters who can teleport
Marvel Comics characters who have mental powers
Marvel Comics characters with accelerated healing
Marvel Comics characters with superhuman strength
Marvel Comics male supervillains
Marvel Comics mutants
Marvel Comics telekinetics
Marvel Comics telepaths
Marvel Comics vampires